Cloverland is an unincorporated community in Posey Township, Clay County, Indiana. It is part of the Terre Haute Metropolitan Statistical Area.

Geography
Cloverland is within the humid continental climate zone. The terrain is gently rolling and includes a small brook.

History
The town was platted in 1834 as a speculative venture by Terre Haute doctor Charles Modesitt. The town grew steadily with several general stores, a carpentry shop, and several other ventures. With the construction of the railroad, business activity shifted to nearby Brazil, and the town's population dwindled. A post office was established at Cloverland in 1850, and remained in operation until it was discontinued in 1920. Today, a church, a commercial building, and cluster of houses are all that remain.

References

Unincorporated communities in Clay County, Indiana
Unincorporated communities in Indiana
Terre Haute metropolitan area
1834 establishments in Indiana
Populated places established in 1834